Zainab Bahrani (born 29 August 1962) is an Iraqi Assyriologist and professor of Ancient Near Eastern Art and Archaeology at Columbia University.

Career
A native of Baghdad, Iraq, she was educated in Europe and the United States. She received her Master of Arts and doctoral degrees (Ph.D. 1989) in art history and archeology from New York University's Institute of Fine Arts.

Prior to her appointment at Columbia University, Bahrani taught at the University of Vienna in Austria, State University of New York at Stony Brook, and was a curator in the Metropolitan Museum of Art's Near Eastern Antiquities Department from 1989 to 1992.

She was Slade Professor of Fine Art at the University of Oxford for 2010–11.

On May 25, 2004, Bahrani was appointed to work with the Coalition Provisional Authority as Senior Consultant for Culture. She has stated that her objective will be to continue the reconstruction of the Iraq National Museum and the Iraq National Library and to identify new opportunities for training and study abroad.

She was elected fellow of the American Academy of Arts and Sciences in 2020.

Books
Dr. Bahrani has written four books:
 The Infinite Image: Art, Time and the Aesthetic Dimension in Antiquity 
 Rituals of War: The Body and Violence in Mesopotamia, New York (2008), 
 The Graven Image: Representation in Babylonia and Assyria, University of Pennsylvania Press (2003), 
 Women of Babylon: Gender and Representation in Mesopotamia, Routledge (2001),

References

External links

Columbia University faculty
Iraqi women academics
Iraqi archaeologists
Iraqi Assyriologists
1962 births
Living people
People from Baghdad
Iraqi emigrants to the United States
Academic staff of the University of Vienna
Stony Brook University faculty
Slade Professors of Fine Art (University of Oxford)
New York University Institute of Fine Arts alumni
Women orientalists
Iraqi women archaeologists
Fellows of the American Academy of Arts and Sciences
Iraqi women curators
Assyriologists